Treaty of Vienna may refer to:

 Treaty of Vienna (1606) (HRE/Hungary - freedom of religion)
 Treaty of Vienna (1656) Austro-Polish alliance in the Second Northern War, ineffective
 Treaty of Vienna (1657) Austro-Polish alliance in the Second Northern War, effective
 Treaty of Vienna (1725) Austria/Spain
 Treaty of Vienna (1731) Britain/Austria - alliance
 Treaty of Vienna (1738) (or The Peace of Vienna) Multiple parties - resolved war of Polish succession
 Treaty of Schönbrunn, also called the Treaty of Vienna (1809), France/Austria - following Austria's defeat during the Napoleonic Wars
 Treaty of Vienna (1815) can refer to several different treaties notably
Secret Treaty of Vienna, defensive pact signed 3 January 1815 between Britain, France and Austria
 Treaty of Vienna of 25 March 1815, (also known as "Treaty of General Alliance") when Austria, Britain, Prussia and Russia agreed to put 150,000 men in the field against Napoleon Bonaparte.(see wikisource:Declaration at the Congress of Vienna).
 Treaty of Vienna of 9 June 1815, (also known as the "Final Act of the Congress of Vienna"), embodying all the separate treaties agreed at the Congress by the European powers.
 Treaty of Vienna (1864) Austria/Prussia/Denmark - concluded the Second Schleswig War
 Treaty of Vienna (1866) Austria/France/Italy
 Treaty of Vienna (1878), Austria/Prussia/Denmark
 Treaty of Peace between Austria-Hungary and Finland (Vienna Peace Treaty, 1918) Austria-Hungary/Finland
 Treaty of Vienna (1955), re-established the state of Austria after the Second World War
 Joint Comprehensive Plan of Action, the final agreement on the 2015 Iran nuclear deal framework, signed in Vienna

See also
 Vienna Award (disambiguation), two agreements before and during World War II that expanded the territory of Hungary
 Vienna Conference (disambiguation)
 Vienna Convention (disambiguation)